Christine von Kohl (1923–2009) was a Danish journalist, writer, broadcaster, human rights activist and Balkan expert. She is remembered in particular for her articles and books on the breakup of Yugoslavia in the 1990s while she was based in Vienna. In 2002, she received the SEEMO human rights award.

Early life
Born on 23 March 1923 in Berlin, Christine von Kohl was the daughter of the Danish film diretor and writer Louis Henri von Kohl (1882–1962) and his Austrian wife Lisa (Lisi) née Steindl (1888–1984).

Career
Brought up in Berlin, in 1960 she moved to Austria as a foreign correspondent. Based in Belgrade from 1968 to 1985, she contributed to a variety of media, including Die Presse, Neue Zürcher Zeitung, Deutsche Welle and Deutschlandfunk as well as several Scandinavian news interests. Back in Vienna, from 1990 to 1994 she worked for the Helsinki Committee for Human Rights and established the Verein der Flüchtlinge und Vertriebenen aus Bosnien-Herzegowina in Österreich (Association for Refugees and Displaced Persons form Bosnia-Herzegovina in Austria). During the Yugoslav Wars in the 1990s, she was recognized across Europe as one of the most reliable radio and newspaper reporters on the Balkan conflicts.

Christine von Kohl died in Vienna on 23 January 2009.

Selected publications

References

External links
Photo of Christine von Kohl receiving the SEEMO award in 2002

1923 births
2009 deaths
20th-century Danish journalists
Danish women journalists
21st-century Danish writers
21st-century Danish women writers
Danish human rights activists
Danish radio presenters
Danish women radio presenters
Writers from Vienna
Danish expatriates in Germany
Danish emigrants to Austria
Austrian expatriates in Yugoslavia